Mr. Robinson could refer to:

 Mr. Robinson (TV series), a 2015 sitcom
 Mr. Robinson (film), a 1976 comedy film
 Mr. Robinson Crusoe, a 1932 comedy film
 Mr. and Master Robinson, pseudonyms used by Hawley Harvey Crippen and his lover Ethel Le Neve
 Mr. Robinson, a role used by Eddie Murphy in Saturday Night Live that parodies Fred Rogers

See also
 Robinson (disambiguation)
 Robinson (name)
 The Robinson family (disambiguation)